Inferno is the seventy-third release and twelfth live album by German electronic group Tangerine Dream. It is the first live album to feature new compositions since 220 Volt Live (1993). The lyrical content is based on the first part of the Italian narrative poem Divine Comedy by Dante Alighieri. Inferno is the first album to feature percussionist Iris Camaa who remained with the group until 2014.

Reception 

Prog Archives described the work as "something of quite astonishing beauty".  The Times Literary Supplement called the work a "musical extravaganza".

Tangerine Dream used the album as a modern soundtrack for the 1911 Italian silent film L'Inferno. Nick Hasted in The Independent wrote that while the film was a "fascinating relic", with their soundtrack "Tangerine Dream add momentum and even melodrama, restricting themselves at times to dark, low strings." Ed Potton included the album in The Times 2021 list of "The 20 best film soundtracks".

Album trilogy

Inferno is the first album of a trilogy consisting of the following albums all inspired by Dante's Divine Comedy:

 Inferno (2002)
 Purgatorio (2004)
 Paradiso (2006)

Track listing
All compositions are by Edgar Froese, except where indicated.

"Before the Closing of the Day" - 4:50 
"The Spirit of Virgil" - 2:39 
"Minotaurae Hunt at Dawn" - 3:24 
"Those Once Broke the First Word" - 3:38 
"Dante in Despair" - 3:25 
"Io Non Mor" - 5:49 
"Vidi Tre Facce" - 4:41 
"At the Deepest Point in Space" - 2:38 
"L'omperador Del Doloroso Regno" - 4:45 
"Voices in the Starless Night" - 4:14 
"Fear and Longing" - 3:06 
"Fallen for Death" - 4:38 
"Where All Light Went Silent" - 3:39 
"Charon, Il Barchere" - 3:59
"La Grey De Los Almas Perdidas" - 7:28
"Justice of the Karma Law" - 3:02 (Jerome Froese)
"As the Sun Moves Towards Heaven" - 7:57 (Edgar Froese, Jerome Froese)
"Beatrice, L'Âme Infinie" - 5:10

Personnel
 Tangerine Dream

 Edgar Froesekeyboards, sequencer
 Jerome Froesekeyboards, sequencer
 Iris Camaa (credited as "Iris Kulterer")kettledrums, percussion, alto vocals

 Guest vocalists

 Bianca Acquayealto vocals
 Jayney Klimekalto vocals
 Claire Foquetmezzo vocals
 Barbara Kindermannsoprano vocals
 Bry Gonzalessoprano vocals
 Jane Monetsoprano vocals

References

External links
 Inferno on YouTube
 

2002 albums
Tangerine Dream albums
Music based on Inferno (Dante)